The National Vaccine Program Office (NVPO) is an office of the United States Department of Health and Human Services that plays a role in the coordination of vaccine policy. It was established by the National Childhood Vaccine Injury Act. On October 24, 2020, the New York Times asserted that the Trump administration essentially eliminated the role of the program when it closed the office in 2019.

References

External links
 National Vaccine Program

Vaccination-related organizations
Office of the Assistant Secretary for Health
Vaccination in the United States